Commodore Rock is the second EP by English electronic band Ladytron. It was released in June 2000 by Invicta Hi-Fi Records (UK) and Emperor Norton (US) on CD and 12" formats. A 10" vinyl special edition was released by French label Tricadel in the same year. This edition included Ladytron's debut single "He Took Her To a Movie" remixed by Tricadel's owner Bertrand Burgalat and the instrumental "Olivetti Jerk".

"Playgirl" was sung by Helen Marnie. "Commodore Rock" and "Paco!" were sung by Mira Aroyo. "Miss Black" and "Olivetti Jerk" are instrumentals. "Playgirl", "Commodore Rock" and "Paco!" were later included on the Ladytron's debut album 604.

Daniel Hunt is credited for EP's design, Reuben Wu for EP's illustration and Mira Aroyo for photography.

Reception

Commodore Rock received a 4/5 rating from Allmusic. According to Allmusic, Ladytron "recall Devo with their quirky structure and heavy Moog usage".

Exclaim.ca gave a very positive review of this EP: "dance but not too, lounge but not overly, these retro-futurists play their brand of new wave international jet set electronic pop so perfectly cool that it's almost scary. Employing vintage synthesisers, old school beat boxes and crisp, sophisticated female vocals, this British-based quartet recall bands like Stereolab, yet retain their own distinct vibe".

According to Pitchfork, "still, though uneven, Commodore Rock remains a worthwhile listen and should be counted as a promising debut".

Track listing

CD & 12"
"Playgirl" – 3:55
"Commodore Rock" – 4:48
"Miss Black" – 1:54
"Paco!" – 2:59

10" (Tricatel edition)
"Playgirl" – 3:52
"Commodore Rock" – 4:47
"He Took Her To a Movie" (Bertrand Mix) – 3:48
"Olivetti Jerk" – 3:25

Credits
Design: Danny
Illustration: Reuben
Photography: Mira
Producer: Ladytron, Lance Thomas
Written: Ladytron

References

2000 EPs
Ladytron albums